Veronika Moral (born Verónica Moral; 30 August 1978) is a Spanish actress known for appearing in the long-running telenovela Amar en tiempos revueltos and also for her acting in Compañeros, Física o Química, Qué vida más triste, Ciega a citas, Vis a vis, Lejos del mar, La novia and Zipi y Zape y el club de la canica.

Early life 
Verónica Moral was born on 30 August 1978 in Burgos, the sixth of her sisters. She raised there until the age of 8 when she and her family moved to San Sebastián (Basque). She studied business.

Career 
Her debut as a film actress was in 1999 under the command of Eneko Olasagasti and Carlos Zabalacon. Verónica debuted in the film Sí, quiero... including actors and actresses like Cayetana Gillén Cuervo and Jaime Blanch.

On 2001, in addition to appearing in an episode of Policías en el corazón de la calle, Verónica also joined the Antena 3's serie named Ciudad Sur along with Yolanda Aristegui, José Ángel Egido, Pablo Rivero, and others.

A short-film titled Primera persona was directed by Gorka Merchán the following year, on 2002, and Verónica was one of the actresses from the film. On that same year, she also appeared in the Antena 3 serie Compañeros (Partners) when Verónica was also preparing her actuation for a play titled Federica de Bramante o las florecitas del fango directed by Pedro G. de las Heras in late 2002 and early 2003.

Her following TV projects were two fixed roles in the series Tres son multitud (Telecinco, 2003) and Capital (Telemadrid, 2004), including an apparition in Paco y Veva (TVE, 2004). She also appeared in some episodes from the series Los Serranos (Telecinco, 2005).

During 2006, Verónica was an actress for a TV-movie, Mobbing by Sonia Sánchez starred by Cristina Marcos. 
In 2007, Verónica contributed to Tres de Ases: el secreto de la Atlántida directed by Joseba Vázquez and the serie C.I.A.: No somos ángeles (Antena 3).

Between 2008 and 2009, Verónica Moral joins some series: Plan América (TVE), Física o Química (Antena 3), Los misterios de Laura (TVE), Qué vida más triste (LaSexta) and Euskolegas in ETB 2 TV.

Verónica Moral is also known for her work in Amar en tiempos revueltos'¡ from La 1 (TVE) since 2009 until 2010.

Lately, Verónica has been working in films like L'assiette de mon voisin by David Merlin-Dufey and Olivier Riche, Zipi y Zape y el club de la canica by Oskar Santos, La novia by Paula Ortiz and Lejos del mar by Imanol Uribe, but also in series like Los quién (Antena 3), Frágiles (Telecinco), Ciega a citas (Cuatro) and Gym Tony (Cuatro). Verónica also appears in Vis a vis (Locked Up) acting as a policewoman, portraying Carmen de Icaza in the miniseries Lo que escondían sus ojos and also performing in Mar de plástico.

As of 2017, Verónica will appear in the serie Perdóname Señor from Telecinco.

TV series 
 Goenkale (ETB 1)
 Jaun ta Jabe (ETB 1)
 El Show de (ETB 2)
 Campus (ETB 2)
 Alquilados (ETB 2)
 Ciudad Sur (2001) (Antena 3)
 Policías, en el corazón de la calle (2001), cap. "Los últimos versos que yo escribo" Antena 3
 Compañeros (2002) (5 capítulos) as Laura (Antena 3)
 Tres son multitud (2003) as María (Telecinco)
 Qué vida más triste (2008) as herself
 Locked Up (2016) as Helena Martín  (Antena 3)
 Perdóname, señor (2017) as Marta Soler

Filmography 
 El colchón de Roberto Perez-Toledo, Corto (2015)
 Lejos del mar de Imanol Uribe, (2014) as Asun
 La novia de Paula Ortiz, (2014) as Muchacha 2
 Una vez de María Guerra y Sonia Madrid, Short-film ( 2014)

Music video 
 	Alis (2013), track "Cantos de ocasión"

References

External links 
 http://www.diariovasco.com/20090614/ultima/disfruto-cuando-hago-papeles-20090614.html
 http://www.lahiguera.net/cinemania/actores/veronica_moral/biografia.php
 
 https://www.granviacomunicacion.com/index.php/noticias/88-veronika-moral-profeta-en-su-tierra

1978 births
Living people
Basque women
21st-century Spanish actresses